Aatos Martin Hirvisalo (17 December 1915 – 18 August 1992) was a Finnish sailor. He competed in the Dragon event at the 1948 Summer Olympics.

References

External links
 
 

1915 births
1992 deaths
Finnish male sailors (sport)
Olympic sailors of Finland
Sailors at the 1948 Summer Olympics – Dragon
Sportspeople from Helsinki